The Medical Center Leeuwarden (MCL) is the hospital of the city of Leeuwarden, and the largest non-university hospital in the Netherlands. It is one of the country's major top-clinical centers, offering secondary and tertiary care.

It has 647 beds, and offers all common specialties including pulmonology, cardiovascular surgery and neurosurgery. It is also a teaching hospital for numerous medical specialties, as well as nurses.

A secondary hospital affiliated with the MCL, called MCL-Harlingen, is located in the town of Harlingen. This hospital merged with the MCL because it was too small to prevent closure, unless it merged with another, larger hospital.

External links
 MCL.nl

Teaching hospitals in the Netherlands
Buildings and structures in Leeuwarden
Hospital buildings completed in 1971